Being Ian is a Canadian animated series produced by Studio B Productions and Nelvana Limited for YTV, focusing on 12-year-old Ian Kelley, who aspires to become a filmmaker. It originally aired from April 26, 2005, to October 11, 2008.

The series is created by and based on the early life of creator Ian James Corlett. It is set in the city of Burnaby, British Columbia. Produced in 2004, it debuted on April 26, 2005, on YTV.

Characters

Kelley family

Ian Kelley (voiced by Richard Ian Cox) is the protagonist of the series. Ian Kelley aspires to become a filmmaker. Unfortunately, his family is mostly indifferent towards his creative streak, which is a constant source of frustration for him. Ian is intelligent, if somewhat naive, he has a very large imagination, and often gets lost in daydreams (many of which are parodies of famous films). His ultimate dream is to win an Academy Award, to the point that he constantly practices his acceptance speech, just so he will not be caught speechless if and when it ever does happen. Aside from this, Ian is a typical sitcom child; most plots involve him either failing at an elaborate scheme or trying desperately to survive in a world that does not seem to fit his ideals. According to the episode "Being Principal Bill", Ian's middle name is James, a reference to Ian James Corlett, whom he is based on. He has a crush on Sandi as seen in various animated thoughts. 
Kenneth "Ken" Kelley (voiced by Louis Chirillo) is Ian's father. He owns Kelley's Keyboards, a local music store. Ken, while a loving husband and father, is somewhat clueless, easily distracted, and chronically uncool. While he tries his best to keep his household in check, every member of his family knows exactly how to get their way with him. Ken is chronically dependent on his wife to keep his life in check; when she temporarily left him, it only took a few days for him to regress to a neanderthal. When he was younger, Ken dreamed of becoming a recording star and showing up to all of the "cool" kids who snubbed him. However, his recording career ended the same day it began, as the only song he played was "I's the B'y". While often used for comic relief, Ken can be a sympathetic character, especially when he seems aware of how uncool he is. Ken is a workaholic and has a very gung-ho attitude towards volunteer service, seemingly oblivious to the fact that his sons do not share his attitude. His catchphrase is "Holy Moli, Ravioli!".
Victoria "Vicky" Kelley (née Menske) (voiced by Patricia Drake) is Ian's mother from Poland. She is an easygoing, but short tempered mother. She divides her time as a homemaker and helping Ken run the music store. While she loves her husband and sons very dearly, they all have a good reason to fear her wrath. While she usually is the most level-headed member of the family, Vicki can be surprisingly petty and selfish when she does not get her own way. She also constantly annoys her family with odd obsessions she develops (collector's spoons, organic food, deformed animals, etc.), to the point of being oblivious to anything else. Usually her husband and sons are at her wrath, while she is proud of their achievements and they care about each other.
Kyle Kelley (voiced by Ty Olsson) is Ian's brother and the oldest of the family. A laid-back, somewhat doltish teenager, Kyle is not stupid so much as lazy; he knows how to get his way around the house, and sees no reason to put any real effort into anything. Unknown to most, he is actually very intelligent; he is able to spell highly difficult words with ease, can perform complex mathematical equations in his head, and can memorize entire science textbooks. The only thing that Kyle is really interested in is the opposite sex; he readily will take chase after any attractive female that catches his eye, but his pursuits seldom lead to anything other than rejection. As with Korey, Kyle has a playfully antagonistic relationship with the well-behaved Ian; while he probably cares for the "doofus" deep down, the temptations to play off of Ian's gullibility and sensitivity are too much for him to resist most of the time.
Korey Kelley (voiced by Matt Hill) is Ian's other brother and the middle child of the three. Korey is a rather idiosyncratic individual – not even his own family understands him most of the time. Most of the time Korey seems lost in his own world. Despite this, Korey actually has a sharp mind and is often very observant – it seems he simply chooses not to be aware of his surroundings most of the time. Caught in the middle between his two brothers, as being the middle child Korey combines the niceness and sensitiveness of the youngest child and the laziness of the oldest to form his own personality. Although it's not shown as much, Korey (sometimes openly) shows affection and kindness for Ian and his other family members; however, this is overlooked quite a lot as he is often playing pranks with Kyle and is very lazy at times. A running gag is that Korey never removes his cap, even when he sleeps.
Chopin (voiced by David Kaye) is the Kelley family dog, a lap dog of indeterminate breed who is missing one of his hind legs. Ian received him as a gift when he was young, and it has since come out that Vicky, who cares deeply for deformed animals, told him that all dogs have three legs at the time. Chopin's role is mostly limited to physical comedy – an often-used gag is the fact that Chopin is unable to stay upright when he lifts a leg to urinate.

Other characters

Tyrone "Ty" Washington (voiced by Dexter Bell) is Ian's best friend from the United States. Considerably more together than Ian, Tyrone often attempts to act as the voice of reason, although he is usually willing to go along with whatever schemes his friend cooks up. Tyrone is usually the one to pull Ian back to reality when one of his fantasies goes too far. His father is a 6'8" African-American basketball player. His mother is a 4'3" Asian nurse.
Sandra "Sandi" Crocker (voiced by Tabitha St. Germain) is Ian's other best friend. She is an athletic, short-tempered tomboy, and can physically dominate Ian and Tyrone easily. Together with Tyrone, Sandi often acts as a bemused sort of Greek chorus to Ian's antics. Her relationship with the boys is completely platonic, although she once accidentally admitted that she expects Ian and Tyrone's friendship to be strained by fighting for her affections when they become older. There is, however, a slight romance hinted between Ian and Sandi.
Eleanor Kelley (voiced by Patricia Drake) is Ken's patriotic mother from Scotland. She speaks in a thick brogue and can terrorize her entire family with little effort – no member of her family is willing to cross her. A clever joke is made of this in the opening theme at one point; Ian fantasizes his family as movie monsters, but Grandma Kelley stays exactly the same.
Mary Menske (voiced by Christina Jastrzembska) is Vicky's mother. Being a doting grandmother, she is constantly pampering her family with hearty meals and tacky hand-made clothing. She never approved of Ken's marriage to Vicky; she rather sees it as a result of a Gypsy curse on her family. Even after Ken and Vicky had been married for two decades, she still held out on hope for Vicky to get back with her ex-boyfriend Lubomir Wormchuk. She only gave her blessing to the marriage when she discovered that Lubomir had lost his teeth (what had attracted her attention in the first place).
Odbald (voiced by Ian James Corlett) is Ken's assistant at Kelley's Keyboards. A rural immigrant from the Netherlands, he moved to Canada to escape a life of "polishing cheeses and carving wooden shoes". Odbald, despite being an adult, is very immature – leaving him in charge of the Kelley boys always results in disaster. Odbald is an expert in keyboards of all kinds, to the point that he becomes emotionally attached to them. Odbald is utterly devoted to Ken – or "Mishter Kelley", as he calls him – and often goes out of his way to aid Ken in tasks far beyond his duties in Kelley's Keyboards. Whenever Ken accidentally damages something, his stock response is to say "Odbald, could you take care of that for me?" Odbald lives in the back room of Kelley's Keyboards and has a proclivity for nodding off at inappropriate times and eating messily.
Bill McCammon (voiced by Richard Newman) is Ian's school principal at Celine Dion Middle School. He does not trust Ian sometimes due to his imagination, as well as his family. Nevertheless, he does his best to set forward a proper education for the entire school.
Mr. Greeble (voiced by Peter Kelamis and Ty Olsson on his first appearance) is one of Ian's teachers at Celine Dion Middle School. Like Mr. McCammon, he does not trust Ian sometimes due to his imagination.
Ronald Fleeman (voiced by Ian James Corlett) is the owner of a smoothie shop next door to Kelley's Keyboards (and Spa).

Episodes

Season 1 (2005)
Season 1 episodes are directed by Andy Bartlett and Josh Mepham.

Season 2 (2005–06)
Episodes in season 2 are directed by Josh Mepham.

Season 3 (2007–08)
Season 3 episodes are directed by Chad Van De Keere.

Broadcast
The series first aired in the United States on Jetix from September 15, 2005 to November 14, 2007, along with Carl². The series also aired on Qubo from September 19 to October 24, 2009, and continued to air on Qubo's Night Owl block until March 25, 2018. However it returned to Qubo on May 29, 2018, as part of the network's Night Owl Block until September 29, 2018. In 2012, YTV stopped airing reruns in Canada. Nickelodeon Canada aired reruns of the show from September 5, 2011, to September 2, 2013. Reruns continued to air on BBC Kids in Canada until the network's closure on December 31, 2018. However, it returned on April 5, 2020, on Qubo until January 1, 2021 during the New Year and before it's shutdown the same year by Ion. 

In Australia, it aired on ABC1, ABC2, and ABC3.

In the UK, it aired on CBBC.

In India, it aired on Disney Channel.

In South Africa, it aired on K-T.V.

References

External links
The Being Ian website on YTV.com
Ian James Corlett (see Being Ian in the Original Projects section)

2005 Canadian television series debuts
2008 Canadian television series endings
Burnaby
Canadian children's animated comedy television series
Television shows set in British Columbia
Television shows filmed in Vancouver
YTV (Canadian TV channel) original programming
Television series by Nelvana
Television series by DHX Media
English-language television shows
2000s Canadian animated television series
Canadian television series with live action and animation
Animated television series about children
Television series about filmmaking